The  is a third-sector operator of four railway lines in Fukuoka Prefecture, Japan. The railway's nickname is Heichiku.

Principal investors
Fukuoka Prefecture holds 27.5% of the stock in the railway. The cities of Tagawa, Nōgata, and Yukuhashi hold 14.8%, 6.6%, and 6.6% each.

Lines
Ita Line (16.1 km) - The Nogata to Kaneda section opened in 1893, and the Kaneda to Tagawa-Ita section in 1899. The line was double-tracked in 1911, and freight services ceased in 2004.
Itoda Line (6.8 km) - The Tagawa-Gotoji to Itoda section opened in 1897 to haul coal and the Itoda to Kaneda section opened in 1929 to service a cement plant.
Tagawa Line (26.3 km) - The entire Tagawa-Ita to Yukuhashi line opened in 1895.
Mojikō Retro Kankō Line (2.1 km) - The Mojiko to Moji Harbour line opened in 1929, and freight services ceased in 2004. Despite a significant landslide in 2006, the line was reopened as a tourist line in 2009.

The Mojikō Retro Kankō Line is classified as a  under the Railway Business Act of Japan as it does not purport to transport daily passengers or freight. Heisei Chikuhō Railway operates trains as Category 2 operator (as defined in the Act, see "Rail transport in Japan" for details) on the track owned by the city of Kitakyūshū as Category 3 operator.

Rolling stock
, the railway operates a fleet of 12 single-car 400 series diesel railcars (numbered 401 to 412) and one 500 series diesel railcar (numbered 501).

In 2016, the railway purchased former KiHa 2000 series diesel rail car KiHa 2004 from the Hitachinaka Seaside Railway in Ibaraki Prefecture, which was withdrawn from service in December 2015. In 2019, the Coto Coto Train started as a new touristic service in the Fukuoka Prefecture.

Former rolling stock

The former 300 series DMU cars operated by the railway were withdrawn December 2010. Car 303 was shipped to Myanmar, and car 304 is retained in operating condition for use on special driving days by members of the general public.

History
The company was founded on April 26, 1989. On October 1, 1989 it assumed the operations of its three lines, which were formerly part of the JR Kyushu network.

On April 26, 2009 the company started the operation of the Mojikō Retro Kankō Line, a short railway for tourists in Moji-ku, Kitakyūshū.

See also
 List of railway lines in Japan

References
This article incorporates material from the corresponding article in the Japanese Wikipedia.

External links
Heichiku Net 

 
Railway companies of Japan
Japanese third-sector railway lines
1989 establishments in Japan